Sen Sok is an administrative district (khan) of Phnom Penh, Cambodia. It contains the Sen Sok International University Hospital.

Administration 

Khan Sen Sok was established in 2008–2009 by taking three Sangkats—Khmuonh, Phnom Penh Thmei and Tuek Thla—from Khan Russey Keo. The population recorded in the resulting area by the 2008 census was 120,579.

In 2010 Ponhea Pon, Prek Pnov and Samraong communes were added to the Khan from Ponhea Lueu District, Kandal Province. In 2013, the latter three Sangkats formed a part of a new entity, Khan Prek Pnov, while Sangkat Krang Thnong, previously belonging to Khan Pou Senchey, was added to Sen Sok. In 2016, two new Sangkats were established by separating areas from existing subdivisions—Ou Baek K'am from Tuek Thla and Kouk Khleang from Phnom Penh Thmei.

As of 2020, Sen Sok is subdivided into six Sangkats (communes) and 47 Phums (villages).

Buddhist temples
List of pagodas/wats/buddist template in Khan Sen Sok
 Wat Sovann Mony Sakor (Wat Samrong Andeth)
 Wat Botum Veary (Wat Khmuonh)
 Wat Tuek Thla
 Wat Kraing Thnong
 Wat Sovann Monyvong (Wat Anlong Kngan)
 Wat Sen Sok
 Wat Preah Barmey VongKut Borey

Education

Northbridge International School Cambodia is in Teuk Thlar Commune, Sen Sok Section.

Home of English International School has a Toul Kork Branch in Sen Sok Section.

The Japanese School of Phnom Penh, a full-time Japanese school, is in Sangkat Toek Thla in Sen Sok. It was established in 2015.

The Japanese Supplementary School of Phnom Penh (プノンペン補習授業校 Punonpen Hoshū Jugyō Kō), formerly known in English as the Phnom Penh Japanese School, is a part-time Japanese school, in Sangkat Toek Thla in Sen Sok. It is operated by the Japanese Association of Cambodia (JACAM;カンボジア日本人会 Kambojia Nihonjin-kai), and was established in 2002. It had 60 students in June 2011.

Landmarks

References

Districts of Phnom Penh